Lingnan (岭南) is a geographic region in southern China.

Lingnan ( unless otherwise noted) may also refer to:

 Lingnan University (disambiguation)

Hong Kong 
 Lingnan Primary School, at Stubbs Road, Hong Kong
 Lingnan Secondary School, Heng Fa Chuen, Hong Kong
 Lingnan University Library, on the campus of Lingnan University, Hong Kong

Mainland China 
 Zhongjin Lingnan, a Chinese company
 Lingnan culture, the culture of Guangdong
 West Lingnan Circuit of the Tang Dynasty
 Lingnan, Guangxi, in Heshan
 Lingnan Township, Anhui, in Xiuning County
 Lingnan Township, Zhejiang, in Shangyu
 Lingnan Subdistrict, Guangzhou, in Liwan District
 Lingnan Subdistrict, Hegang, in Xingshan District, Hegang, Heilongjiang
 Lingnan Subdistrict, Jinzhou (凌南街道), in Taihe District, Jinzhou, Liaoning

See also
 Yeongnam (disambiguation) (Hangul: 영남)
 Lĩnh Nam, also the name of a ward in Hanoi, Vietnam